Maple is a surname. Notable people with the surname include:

Dale Maple (1920–2001), US Army private convicted of a crime equivalent to treason in World War II
Eddie Maple (born 1948), American retired thoroughbred horse racing jockey
Howard Maple (1903–1970), National Football League and Major League Baseball player
Jack Maple (1952–2001), American police officer
Marvin L. Maple, (1936-2016) Grandfather accused of kidnaping his grandchildren
Sir John Blundell Maple, 1st Baronet (1845–1903), English businessman
Sam Maple (1953–2001), American thoroughbred horse racing jockey, brother of Eddie Maple
Sarah Maple (born 1985), British visual artist
T. M. Maple (pseudonym of Jim Burke, c. 1956–1994), Canadian comic book letter-writer